ACSF may refer to:
 All-China Sports Federation
 American Clean Skies Foundation
 Artificial cerebrospinal fluid
 Atkinson Center for a Sustainable Future